Oğuz Gürbulak (born 10 August 1992) is a Turkish footballer who plays as a midfielder for Ümraniyespor.

Professional career
Gürbulak is a youth product of 1922 Konyaspor, and began his senior career with them in 2010. He was released by the club, and he ended up playing with the amateur side Sarayönü Belediyespor for 2 years. After a prolific spell in the amateurs scoring 26 goals, he moved to the semi-pro side Manavgatspor on 5 June 2013. He returned to 1922 Konyaspor in the summer of 2015. On 8 July 2017, he moved to Samsunspor on a 2-year contract. He helped Samsunspor earn promotion into the TFF First League for the 2019-20 season.

On 7 July 2021, Gürbulak transferred to Ümraniyespor signing a 2-year contract. He helped them earn promotion into the Süper Lig after coming in second for the 2021–22 TFF First League season. He made his professional debut with Ümraniyespor in a 3–3 Süper Lig tie with Fenerbahçe on 8 August 2022, where he assisted his sides second goal.

Personal life
While playing with the amateur side Sarayönü Belediyespor, Gürbulak attained a degree in mechanical engineering from Selçuk University.

References

External links
 
 

1992 births
Living people
People from Erzincan Province
Turkish footballers
1922 Konyaspor footballers
Samsunspor footballers
Ümraniyespor footballers
Süper Lig players
TFF First League players
TFF Second League players
TFF Third League players
Association football midfielders